There are currently 182 Protected Natural Areas in Mexico, covering 25.4 million hectares in total. They are protected and administrated by the National Commission of Protected Natural Areas (Comisión Nacional de Áreas Naturales Protegidas, or 'CONANP'), a federal agency. CONANP administers:

 67 Mexican National Parks
 44 biosphere reserves
 40 flora and fauna protection areas
 18 Mexican Nature Sanctuaries
 9 natural resources protection areas
 11 natural monuments

See also
 LGEEPA - Mexico's groundbreaking 1988 environmental legislation

References

External links
CONANP web site (Spanish)
ÁREAS NATURALES PROTEGIDAS DECRETADAS (Spanish)  

 
Geography of Mexico
Natural history of Mexico